Eleanor Gwyn (2 February 1650 – 14 November 1687; also spelled Gwynn, Gwynne) was a celebrity figure of the Restoration period. Praised by Samuel Pepys for her comic performances as one of the first actresses on the English stage, she became best known for being a long-time mistress of King Charles II of England. Called "pretty, witty Nell" by Pepys, she has been regarded as a living embodiment of the spirit of Restoration England and has come to be considered a folk heroine, with a story echoing the rags-to-royalty tale of Cinderella. Gwyn had two sons by King Charles: Charles Beauclerk (1670–1726) and James Beauclerk (1671–1680). Charles Beauclerk (pronounced boh-clair) was created Earl of Burford and later Duke of St Albans.

Early life
The details of Gwyn's background are somewhat obscure. A horoscope in the Ashmolean manuscripts gives her date of birth as 2 February 1650. On the other hand, an account published in The New Monthly Magazine and Humorist in 1838 states that she was born about 1642. The earlier date of birth was asserted without documentation, but various scholars have supported both the earlier and later dates. The eight-year difference between these two possible birth years can offer different readings of what Gwyn achieved during her lifetime.

The obscurity surrounding Gwyn's date of birth parallels numerous other obscurities that run through the course of her life. The information we have about Gwyn is collected from various sources, including the plays she starred in, satirical poetry and pictures, diaries, and letters. As such, much of this information is founded on hearsay, gossip, and rumour, and must therefore be handled with caution.

Her mother Ellen (or a variant, being referred to in her lifetime as "Old Madam", "Madam Gwyn" and "Old Ma Gwyn") was born, according to a monumental inscription, in the parish of St Martin in the Fields, which stretched from Soho and Covent Garden to beyond Mayfair, and is thought to have lived most of her life there in the West End. She is also believed, by most Gwyn biographers, to have been "low-born". Her descendant and biographer Charles Beauclerk calls this conjecture, based solely on what is known of her later life. Madam Gwyn is sometimes said to have had the maiden surname Smith. This appears to be derived from a fragmentary pedigree by Anthony Wood that shows signs of confusion between different Gwyn families and it has not been firmly established. Nell's mother is said to have drowned when she fell into the water at her house near Chelsea. She was buried on 30 July 1679, in her 56th year, at St Martin in the Fields.

Nell Gwyn is reported in a manuscript of 1688 to have been a daughter of "Thos [Thomas] Guine a Capt [captain] of ane antient fammilie in Wales", although the reliability of the statement is doubtful as its author does not seem to have hesitated to create or alter details where the facts were unknown or perhaps unremarkable. There is some suggestion, from a poem dated to 1681, again of doubtful accuracy, that Gwyn's father died at Oxford, perhaps in prison. It has been suggested, based on the pedigree by Anthony Wood, that Gwyn was a granddaughter of Edward or Edmund Gwyn, Canon of Christ Church from 1615 to 1624. However, administration records show that Edmund Gwyn died unmarried. Moreover, Wood did not give a forename for the supposed grandfather of Nell and there are reasons to think that the "Dr ... Gwyn" in the pedigree was intended to be not Edmund Gwyn but rather his brother Matthew. In either case, the available evidence indicates that Nell was not a member of their family.

Gwyn was assigned arms similar to those of the Gwynnes of Llansannor. However, her specific connection to that family, if any, is unknown.

Three cities make the claim to be Gwyn's birthplace: Hereford, London (specifically Covent Garden) and Oxford. Evidence for any one of the three is scarce. The fact that "Gwyn" is a name of Welsh origin might support Hereford, as its county is on the border with Wales; The Dictionary of National Biography notes a traditional belief that she was born there in Pipe Well Lane, renamed to Gwynne Street in the 19th century. There is also the legend that Nell Gwynne chose red coats for the Chelsea Pensioners of the Royal Hospital Chelsea she allegedly influenced Charles II to found because she remembered the pensioners of Coningsby Hospital in Hereford wore coats of the same colour. London is the simplest choice, perhaps, since Gwyn's mother was born there and that is where she raised her children. Alexander Smith's 1715 Lives of the Court Beauties says she was born in Coal Yard Alley in Covent Garden and other biographies, including Wilson's, have followed suit. Her noble descendant Beauclerk pieces together circumstantial evidence to favour an Oxford birth.

One way or another, Gwyn's father seems to have been out of the picture by the time of her childhood in Covent Garden, and her "dipsomaniac mother, [and] notorious sister", Rose, were left in a low situation. She experimented with cross-dressing between 1663 and 1667 going under the name "William Nell" and adopting a false beard; her observations informed a most successful and hilarious character interpretation acting as a man on the stage in March 1667. Old Madam Gwyn was by most accounts an alcoholic whose business was running a bawdy house (or brothel). There, or in the bawdy house of one Madam Ross, Nell would spend at least some time. It is possible that she herself was a child prostitute; Peter Thomson, in the Oxford Illustrated History of Theatre, says it is "probable". A rare mention of her upbringing from the source herself might be seen to contradict the idea: A 1667 entry in Samuel Pepys' diary records, second-hand, that.Here Mrs. Pierce tells me [...] that Nelly and Beck Marshall, falling out the other day, the latter called the other my Lord Buckhurst's whore. Nell answered then, "I was but one man's whore, though I was brought up in a bawdy-house to fill strong waters to the guests; and you are a whore to three or four, though a Presbyter's praying daughter!" It is not out of the question that Gwyn was merely echoing the satirists of the day, if she said this at all. 

Various anonymous verses are the only other sources describing her childhood occupations: bawdyhouse servant, street hawker of herring, oysters, or turnips, and cinder-girl have all been put forth. Tradition has her growing up in Coal Yard Alley, a poor slum off Drury Lane.

Around 1662, Nell is said to have taken a lover by the name of Duncan or Dungan. Their relationship lasted perhaps two years and was reported with obscenity-laced acidity in several later satires; "For either with expense of purse or p---k, / At length the weary fool grew Nelly-sick". Duncan provided Gwyn with rooms at a tavern in Maypole Alley, and the satires also say he was involved in securing Nell a job at the theatre being built nearby.

During the decade of protectorate rule by the Cromwells, pastimes regarded as frivolous, including theatre, had been banned. Charles II had been restored to the English throne in 1660 and quickly reinstated the theatre. One of Charles' early acts as king was to license the formation of two acting companies and to legalise acting as a profession for women. In 1663 the King's Company, led by Thomas Killigrew, opened a new playhouse, the Theatre in Bridges/Brydges Street, which was later rebuilt and renamed the Theatre Royal, Drury Lane.

Mary Meggs, a former prostitute nicknamed "Orange Moll" and a friend of Madam Gwyn's, had been granted the licence to "vend, utter and sell oranges, lemons, fruit, sweetmeats and all manner of fruiterers and confectioners wares" within the theatre. Orange Moll hired Nell and her elder sister Rose as scantily clad ‘orange-girls’, selling the small, sweet "china" oranges to the audience inside the theatre for a sixpence each. The work exposed her to multiple aspects of theatre life and to London's higher society: this was after all "the King's playhouse", and Charles frequently attended performances. The orange-girls would also serve as messengers between men in the audience and actresses backstage; they received monetary tips for this role and some of these messages would end in sexual assignations. Whether this activity rose to the level of pimping may be a matter of semantics.

Actress 

The new theatres were the first in England to feature actresses; earlier, women's parts had been played by boys or men. Gwyn joined the rank of actresses at Bridges Street when she was fourteen (if we take her birth year to be 1650), less than a year after becoming an orange-girl.

If her good looks, strong clear voice, and lively wit were responsible for catching the eye of Killigrew, she still had to prove herself clever enough to succeed as an actress. This was no easy task in the Restoration theatre; the limited pool of audience members meant that very short runs were the norm for plays and fifty different productions might be mounted in the nine-month season lasting from September to June. She was reputed to have been illiterate.

She was taught her craft of performing at a school for young actors developed by Killigrew and one of the fine male actors of the time, Charles Hart, and learned dancing from another, John Lacy; both were rumoured by satirists of the time to be her lovers, but if she had such a relationship with Lacy (Beauclerk thinks it unlikely), it was kept much more discreet than her well-known affair with Hart.

Much like the dispute over her date of birth, it is unclear when Gwyn began to perform professionally on the Restoration stage. It is possible that she first appeared in smaller parts during the 1664–65 season. For example, The Bodleian Manuscript of The Siege of Urbin has the part of Pedro (Melina- a maid servant in breeches) played by a 'Mrs. Nell'. Additionally, 'Nelle' was intended to play the small role of Paulina, a courtesan, in Killigrew's Thomaso, or The Wanderer in November 1664, but the play seems to have been cancelled. The use of 'Mrs' would imply that Gwyn was more likely born in 1642 than 1650 as it indicates an actress over the age of 21 (not her marital status) for which certain roles would be more suitable. Nonetheless, since players of less substantial parts are seldom mentioned in cast lists or playgoers' diaries of the period, an absolute date for Gywn's debut cannot be ascertained.

Whatever her first role as an actress may have been, it is evident that she had become a more prominent actress by 1665. It is around this time when she is first mentioned in Pepys' diary, specifically on Monday 3 April 1665, while attending a play, where the description 'pretty, witty Nell' is first recorded. This unusual use of only her first name would imply that Gwyn had made herself known both on the stage and off as her celebrity status started to emerge. Her first recorded appearance on-stage was in March 1665, in John Dryden's heroic drama The Indian Emperour, playing Cydaria, daughter of Moctezuma and love interest to Cortez, played by her real-life lover Charles Hart.

However, Pepys, whose diary usually has great things to say about Gwyn, was displeased with her performance in this same part two years later: "...to the King's playhouse, and there saw 'The Indian Emperour;' where I find Nell come again, which I am glad of; but was most infinitely displeased with her being put to act the Emperour's daughter; which is a great and serious part, which she do most basely."

Gwyn herself seems to agree that drama did not suit her, to judge from the lines she was later made to say in the epilogue to a Robert Howard drama:

We have been all ill-us'd, by this day's poet.
'Tis our joint cause; I know you in your hearts
Hate serious plays, as I do serious parts.

It was in the new form of restoration comedy that Gwyn would become a star. In May 1665, she appeared opposite Hart in James Howard's comedy All Mistaken, or the Mad Couple.

There is some debate over the year The Mad Couple debuted, with earlier authorities believing it to be 1667. This was the first of many appearances in which Gwyn and Hart played the "gay couple", a form that would become a frequent theme in restoration comedies. The gay couple, broadly defined, is a pair of witty, antagonistic lovers, he generally a rake fearing the entrapment of marriage and she feigning to do the same in order to keep her lover at arm's length. Theatre historian Elizabeth Howe goes so far as to credit the enduring success of the gay couple on the Restoration stage entirely to "the talent and popularity of a single actress, Nell Gwyn".

The Great Plague of London shut down the Bridges Street theatre, along with most of the city, from mid-1665 until late 1666. Gwyn and her mother spent some of this time in Oxford, following the King and his court. The King's Company is presumed to have mounted some private theatrical entertainments for the court during this time away from the virulent capital. Gwyn and the other ten "women comedians in His Majesty's Theatre" were issued the right (and the cloth) to wear the King's livery at the start of this exile, proclaiming them official servants of the King.

After the theatres reopened, Gwyn and Hart returned to play role after role that fit the mould of the gay couple, including in James Howard's The English Monsieur (December 1666), Richard Rhodes' Flora's Vagaries, an adaptation of John Fletcher's The Chances by George Villiers, and then in their greatest success, Secret Love, or The Maiden Queen.

This play, a tragicomedy written by the theatre's house dramatist, John Dryden, was performed in March 1667. It was a great success: King Charles "graced it with the Title of His Play" and Pepys' praise was effusive:

... to the King's house to see 'The Maiden Queen', a new play of Dryden's, mightily commended for the regularity of it, and the strain and wit; and the truth is, there is a comical part done by Nell, which is Florimell, that I never can hope ever to see the like done again, by man or woman. The King and the Duke of York were at the play. But so great performance of a comical part was never, I believe, in the world before as Nell do this, both as a mad girl, then most and best of all when she comes in like a young gallant; and hath the notions and carriage of a spark the most that ever I saw any man have. It makes me, I confess, admire her.

After seeing the play for the third time, Pepys writes, "It is impossible to have Florimel’s part, which is the most comical that ever was made for woman, ever done better than it is by Nelly." Killigrew must have agreed with Pepys's opinion. Once Gwyn left the acting profession, it would be at least ten years before his company revived The Maiden Queen and even the less favoured The Indian Emperour because "the management evidently felt that it would be useless to present these plays without her."

The Maiden Queen featured breeches roles, where the actress appeared in men's clothes under one pretence or another, and as Bax supposes "was one of the first occasions upon which a woman appeared in the disguise of a man"; if nothing else this could draw an audience eager to see the women show off their figures in the more form-fitting male attire. The attraction had another dynamic: the theatres sometimes had a hard time holding onto their actresses, as they were swept up to become the kept mistresses of the aristocracy. In 1667, Gwyn made such a match with Charles Sackville, titled Lord Buckhurst at that time. She supposedly caught his eye during an April performance of All Mistaken, or The Mad Couple, especially in one scene in which, to escape a hugely fat suitor able to move only by rolling, she rolls across the stage herself, her feet toward the audience and her petticoats flying about. A satire of the time describes this and also Hart's position now, in the face of competition from the upper echelons of society:
Yet Hart more manners had, then not to tender
When noble Buckhurst beg'd him to surrender.
He saw her roll the stage from side to side
And, through her drawers the powerful charm descry'd.

Beauclerk describes Buckhurst: "Cultured, witty, satirical, dissolute, and utterly charming". He was one of a handful of court wits, the "merry gang" as named by Andrew Marvell. Sometime after the end of April and her last recorded role that season (in Robert Howard's The Surprisal), Gwyn and Buckhurst left London for a country holiday in Epsom, accompanied by Charles Sedley, another wit in the merry gang. Pepys reports the news on 13 July: "[Mr. Pierce tells us] Lord Buckhurst hath got Nell away from the King's house, lies with her, and gives her £100 a year, so she hath sent her parts to the house, and will act no more." Gwyn was acting once more in late August, and her brief affair with Buckhurst had ended. Pepys reports that by 22 August 1667, Gwyn had returned to the King's Playhouse in The Indian Emperour. On 26 August, Pepys learns from Moll Davis that, 'Nell is already left by my Lord Buckhurst, and that he makes sport of her, and swears she hath had all she could get of him; and Hart, her great admirer, now hates her; and that she is very poor, and hath lost my Lady Castlemayne, who was her great friend also but she is come to the House, but is neglected by them all'.

Relationship with King Charles II 

Late in 1667, George Villiers, 2nd Duke of Buckingham took on the role of unofficial manager for Gwyn's love affairs. He aimed to provide King Charles II with someone who would supplant Barbara Palmer, his principal current mistress and Buckingham's cousin, moving Buckingham closer to the King's ear. The plan failed; reportedly, Gwyn asked £500 a year to be kept and this was rejected as it was regarded as too expensive. Buckingham had an alternative plan, which was to set the King up with Moll Davis, an actress with the rival Duke's Company. Davis would be Gwyn's first rival for the King. Several anonymous satires from the time relate a tale of Gwyn, with the help of her friend Aphra Behn, slipping a powerful laxative into Davis's tea-time cakes before an evening when she was expected in the King's bed.

The love affair between the King and Gwyn allegedly began in April 1668. Gwyn was attending a performance of George Etherege's She Wou'd if She Cou'd at the theatre in Lincoln's Inn Fields. In the next box was the King, who from accounts was more interested in flirting with Gwyn than watching the play. Charles invited Gwyn and her escort, Mr. Villiers, a cousin of Buckingham's, to supper along with his brother the Duke of York. The anecdote turns charming if perhaps apocryphal at this point: the King, after supper, discovered that he had no money on him; nor did his brother, and Gwyn had to foot the bill. "Od's fish!" she exclaimed, in an imitation of the King's manner of speaking, "but this is the poorest company I ever was in!"

Having previously been the mistress of Charles Hart and Charles Sackville, Gwyn jokingly called the King "her Charles the Third". By mid-1668, Gwyn's affair with the King was well-known, though there was little reason to believe it would last for long. She continued to act at the King's House, her new notoriety drawing larger crowds and encouraging the playwrights to craft more roles specifically for her. June 1668 found her in Dryden's An Evening's Love, or The Mock Astrologer, and in July she played in Lacy's The Old Troop, a farce about a company of Cavalier soldiers during the English Civil War, based on Lacy's own experiences. Possibly, Gwyn's father had served in the same company, and Gwyn's part—the company whore—was based on her own mother. As her commitment to the King increased, though, her acting career slowed, and she had no recorded parts between January and June 1669, when she played Valeria in Dryden's very successful tragedy Tyrannick Love.

King Charles II had a considerable number of mistresses through his life, both short affairs and committed arrangements. He also had a wife, Portuguese Queen consort Catherine of Braganza, whose pregnancies all ended in miscarriages, and she had little or no say over Charles's choice to have mistresses. This had come to a head shortly after their marriage in 1662, in a confrontation between Catherine and Barbara Palmer which became known as the "Bedchamber crisis". Ostracised at Court and with most of her retinue sent back to Portugal, Catherine had been left with little choice but to acquiesce to Charles's mistresses being granted semi-official standing.

During Gwyn's first years with Charles, there was little competition in the way of other mistresses: Barbara Palmer was on her way out, while others, such as Moll Davis, kept quietly away from the spotlight of public appearances or Whitehall. Gwyn gave birth to her first son, Charles, on 8 May 1670. This was the King's seventh son—by five separate mistresses.

Several months later, Louise de Kérouaille came to England from France, ostensibly to serve as a maid of honour to Queen Catherine, but also to become another mistress to King Charles, probably by design on both the French and English sides. She and Gwyn would prove rivals for many years to come. They were opposites in personality and mannerism; Louise a proud woman of noble birth used to the sophistication of Versailles, Gwyn a spirited and pranking ex-orange-wench. Gwyn nicknamed Louise "Squintabella" for her looks and the "Weeping Willow" for her tendencies to sob. In one instance, recorded in a letter from George Legge to Lord Preston, Gwyn characteristically jabbed at the Duchess's "great lineage," dressing in black at Court, the same mourning attire as Louise when a prince of France died. Someone there asked, "What the deuce was the Cham of Tartary to you?" to which Gwyn responded, "Oh, exactly the same relation that the French Prince was to Mademoiselle de Kérouaille." The Duchess of Portsmouth's only recorded riposte was, "anybody may know she has been an orange-wench by her swearing". Their relationship was not strictly adversarial; they were known to get together for tea and cards, for example. Basset was the popular game at the time, and Gwyn was a frequent—and high-stakes—gambler.

Gwyn returned to the stage again in late 1670, something Beauclerk calls an "extraordinary thing to do" for a mistress with a royal child. Her return was in Dryden's The Conquest of Granada, a two-part epic produced in December 1670 and January 1671. This may have been her last play; 1671 was almost certainly her last season. Gwyn's theatrical career spanned seven years and ended at the age of 21 (if we take 1650 to be her birth year).

In the cast list of Aphra Behn's The Rover, produced at Dorset Garden in March 1677, the part of Angelica Bianca, "a famous Curtezan" is played by a Mrs. Gwin. This has sparked some confusion. The spelling of 'Gwin' does not refer to Nell Gwyn, but to Mrs. Anne Quin. Nell Gwyn had left the stage by this point.

In February 1671, Gwyn moved into a brick townhouse at 79 Pall Mall. The property was owned by the crown and its current resident was instructed to transfer the lease to Gwyn. It would be her main residence for the rest of her life. Gwyn seemed unsatisfied with being a lessee only—in 1673, a letter written by that of Joseph Williamson stated that "Madam Gwinn complains she has no house yet." Gwyn is said to have complained that "she had always conveyed free under the Crown, and always would; and would not accept [the house] till it was conveyed free to her by an Act of Parliament." In 1676, Gwyn was granted the freehold of the property, which remained in her family until 1693; as of 1960 the property was still the only one on the south side of Pall Mall not owned by the Crown.

Gwyn gave birth to her second child by the King, christened James, on 25 December 1671. Sent to school in Paris when he was six, he died there in 1681. The circumstances of the child's life in Paris and the cause of his death are both unknown, one of the few clues being that he died "of a sore leg", which Beauclerk speculates could mean anything from an accident to poison. Her family's history has been published in the authoritative book: The House of Nell Gwyn (1974).

There are two stories about how the eldest of her two children by Charles was given the Earldom of Burford, both of which are unverifiable. The first, and most popular, is that when Charles was six years old, on the arrival of the King, Gwyn said, "Come here, you little bastard, and say hello to your father." When the King protested against her calling Charles that, she replied, "Your Majesty has given me no other name by which to call him." In response, Charles created him Earl of Burford. Another is that Gwyn grabbed young Charles and hung him out of a window of Lauderdale House in Highgate, where she briefly resided, and threatened to drop him unless he was granted a peerage. The King cried out "God save the Earl of Burford!" and subsequently officially created the peerage, saving his son's life. On 21 December 1676, a warrant was passed for "a grant to Charles Beauclerc, the King's natural son, and to the heirs male of his body, of the dignities of Baron of Heddington, co. Oxford, and Earl of Burford in the same county, with remainder to his brother, James Beauclerc, and the heirs male of his body." A few weeks later, James was given "the title of Lord Beauclerc, with the place and precedence of the eldest son of an earl."

Shortly afterwards, the King granted Gwyn and their son a house, which was renamed Burford House, on the edge of the Home Park in Windsor. She lived there when the King was in residence at Windsor Castle. In addition to the properties mentioned above, Gwyn had a summer residence on the site of what is now 61–63 King's Cross Road, London, which enjoyed later popularity as the Bagnigge Wells Spa. According to the London Encyclopedia (Macmillan, 1983) she "entertained Charles II here with little concerts and breakfasts". An inscribed stone of 1680, saved and reinserted in the front wall of the present building, shows a carved mask which is probably a reference to her stage career.

Just after the death of Henry Jermyn, 1st Earl of St Albans on 5 January 1684, King Charles granted his son Charles the title of Duke of St Albans, gave him an allowance of £1,000 a year, and also granted him the offices of Chief Ranger of Enfield Chase and Master of the Hawks in reversion; i.e., after the death of the current incumbents.

King Charles died on 6 February 1685. James II, obeying his brother's deathbed wish, "Let not poor Nelly starve," eventually paid most of Gwyn's debts and gave her an annual pension of £1,500. He also paid off the mortgage on Gwyn's Nottinghamshire lodge at Bestwood, which remained in the Beauclerk family until 1940. At the same time, James applied pressure on Gwyn and her son Charles to convert to Roman Catholicism, something she resisted.

Death 
In March 1687, Gwyn suffered a stroke that left her paralysed on one side. In May, a second stroke left her confined to the bed in her Pall Mall house; she made out her will on 9 July and a codicil on 18 October with her executors, Laurence Hyde (the Earl of Rochester), Thomas Earl of Pembroke, Sir Robert Sawyer the Attorney General, and Henry Sidney each receiving £100. Gwyn died from apoplexy "almost certainly due to the acquired variety of syphilis" on 14 November 1687, at ten in the evening, less than three years after the King's death. She was 37 years old (if she was born in 1650). Her balance at Child's Bank was reported to be well over four figures, and she possessed almost 15,000 ounces of plate. The Oxford Dictionary of Actors therefore suggests that 'perhaps most of her wealth was in trust or not in liquid assets' which might explain why the rich girl was so poor. A letter from Wigmore to Etherege, the day after Gwyn's burial, reports that Gwyn left 'about 1,000,000 l. stirling, a great many say more, few less'. The majority of her estate went to her son. Gwyn's will also conveys her charitable side with her leaving £100 to be distributed to the poor of the parish of St Martins-in-the-field and Westminster and £50 to release debtors from prison every Christmas.

She was buried in the Church of St Martin-in-the-Fields, London, on 17 November 1687. In compliance with one of Gwyn's final requests, Thomas Tenison, the future Archbishop of Canterbury, preached a sermon on 17 December from the text of Luke 15:7  "Just so, I tell you, there will be more joy in heaven over one sinner who repents than over ninety-nine righteous persons who need no repentance." Her will and codicil were proved on 7 December 1687.

Legacy 

Though Gwyn was often caricatured as an empty-headed woman, John Dryden said that her greatest attribute was her native wit, and she certainly became a hostess who was able to keep the friendship of Dryden, the playwright Aphra Behn, William Ley, 4th Earl of Marlborough (a lover of hers), John Wilmot, 2nd Earl of Rochester, and the King's other mistresses. She is especially remembered for one particularly apt witticism, which was recounted in the memoirs of the Comte de Gramont, remembering the events of 1681:Nell Gwynn was one day passing through the streets of Oxford, in her coach, when the mob mistaking her for her rival, the Duchess of Portsmouth, commenced hooting and loading her with every opprobrious epithet. Putting her head out of the coach window, "Good people", she said, smiling, "you are mistaken; I am the Protestant whore." The Catholic whore was still the Frenchwoman Louise de Kérouaille, who had been created Duchess of Portsmouth in 1673.

The author of her 1752 biography relates a conversation (more than likely fabricated) between Gwyn and Charles II in which he, feeling at a loss, said, "O, Nell! What shall I do to please the People of England? I am torn to pieces by their clamours."

"If it please your Majesty," she replied, "there is but one way left, which expedient I am afraid it will be difficult to persuade you to embrace. Dismiss your ladies, may it please your Majesty, and mind your business; the People of England will soon be pleased."

She is noted for another remark made to her coachman, who was fighting with another man who had called her a whore. She broke up the fight, saying, "I am a whore. Find something else to fight about."

Statue
In 1937, a new ten-storey block of 437 flats in Sloane Avenue, Chelsea, was given the name Nell Gwynn House, and in a high alcove above the main entrance is a statue of Gwyn, with a Cavalier King Charles spaniel at her feet. Mostly unnoticed by passers-by, this is believed to be the only statue of a royal mistress in the capital city.

In stage works and literature
Gwyn has appeared as the principal, or a leading character, in numerous stage works and novels, including:
 1799, The Peckham Frolic : or Nell Gwyn, a comedy in three acts by Edward Jerningham 
 1882, A Royal Amour, a novel by Richard Davey
 1884, Nell Gwynne, an operetta by Robert Planquette and H. B. Farnie
 1900, Sweet Nell of Old Drury a play by Paul Kester 
 1900, Mistress Nell, a swashbuckling melodrama by George Hazelton
 1900, English Nell, a play by Edward Rose, later retitled Nell Gwynne, adapted from Anthony Hope's book, Simon Dale. Composer Edward German wrote incidental music for the play which is still performed on occasion
 1900, Nell Gwyn – Comedian, a novel by Frank Frankfort Moore
 1924, Our Nell, a musical by Harold Fraser-Simson and Ivor Novello; a rewrite of 1919's Our Peg, replacing Peg Woffington with Nell Gwyn. (The 1922 Broadway musical by George Gershwin, also called Our Nell, was not based on the Nell Gwyn story.)
 1926, Mistress Nell Gwynne a novel by Marjorie Bowen
 1928, Orlando: A Biography, a novel by Virginia Woolf, which references "that amorous lady" Nell Gwyn. 
 1939, a character in Bernard Shaw's late play In Good King Charles's Golden Days
 1944, a character in Kathleen Winsor's novel Forever Amber
 1975, Here Lies Our Sovereign Lord, the third part of Jean Plaidy's historical trilogy, The Loves of Charles II
 1986, "Nell Gwyn and her oranges" are referred to in "Move Over Busker", a song from Paul McCartney's Press to Play album.
 1993, a prominent character in Playhouse Creatures, a play by April De Angelis
 2006, The Remarkable Life and Times of Eliza Rose, a children's historical novel by Mary Hooper where Gwyn is a central character
 2007, The Perfect Royal Mistress, a novel by Diane Haeger
 2008, The King's Favorite a novel by Susan Holloway Scott
 2009, Or, a play by Liz Duffy Adams where Gwynne is a central character
 2011, The Darling Strumpet, a debut novel by Gillian Bagwell
 2011, Exit the Actress, a novel by Priya Parmar interwoven with authentic contemporary documents in order to portray the political and social tumult of the time
 2015, Nell Gwynne: A Dramatick Essaye on Acting and Prostitution, a play by Bella Merlin 
 2015–17, Nell Gwynn, a play by Jessica Swale

In film and television
 In the 1911 film, Sweet Nell of Old Drury (based on the play of the same name described above), Gwyn is portrayed by Nellie Stewart
 In the 1915 film, Mistress Nell, based on Hazelton's play of 1900; Gwyn is portrayed by Mary Pickford
 In the 1922 film, The Glorious Adventure, Gwyn is portrayed by Lois Sturt
 In the 1926 film, Nell Gwyn, Gwyn is portrayed by Dorothy Gish
 In the 1934 film, Love, Life and Laughter, Gwyn is portrayed by Gracie Fields
 In the 1934 film, Nell Gwynn, Gwyn is portrayed by Anna Neagle
 In the 1941 film, Hudson's Bay, Gwyn's minor part is portrayed by Virginia Field
 In the 1949 film, Cardboard Cavalier, Gwyn is portrayed by Margaret Lockwood
 In the 1969 mini-series, The First Churchills, Gwyn is portrayed by Andrea Lawrence
 In the 1995 film, England, My England, Gwyn is played by Lucy Speed
 In the 2003 mini-series, Charles II: The Power and The Passion, Gwyn is played by Emma Pierson
 In the 2004 film, Stage Beauty, Gwyn is portrayed by Zoe Tapper

See also
English royal mistress

References

Citations

Sources 

 

 Ford, David Nash (2002). Royal Berkshire History: Nell Gwynne. Nash Ford Publishing.

 Chapter one, "Nell Gwyn" available online.
 Online at www.british-history.ac.uk. (URL accessed 10 June 2006.)
 Entire book available from Google Books.

External links 
Jacob Henry Burn Collection of Nell Gwyn, 1675-1872 at the Harry Ransom Center

 
1650 births
1687 deaths
People from Hereford
People from Oxford
People from Westminster
People from Windsor, Berkshire
17th-century English actresses
Nell
Beauclerk family
Mistresses of Charles II of England
English stage actresses
Fulham
History of the London Borough of Hammersmith and Fulham